The 2015 Texas State Bobcats football team represented Texas State University in the 2015 NCAA Division I FBS football season. They were led by fifth-year head coach Dennis Franchione and played their home games at Bobcat Stadium in San Marcos, Texas. The Bobcats were members of the Sun Belt Conference. They finished the season 3–9, 2–6 in Sun Belt play to finish in tenth place.

Schedule
Texas State announced their 2015 football schedule on February 27, 2015. The 2015 schedule consist of six home and away games in the regular season. The Bobcats will host Sun Belt foes Georgia State, New Mexico State, Louisiana–Monroe, and South Alabama, and will travel to Arkansas State, Georgia Southern, Idaho, and Louisiana–Lafayette.

Schedule source:

Game summaries

at Florida State

Prairie View A&M

Southern Miss

at Houston

at Louisiana–Lafayette

South Alabama

at Georgia Southern

New Mexico State

Georgia State

Louisiana–Monroe

at Idaho

at Arkansas State

References

Texas State
Texas State Bobcats football seasons
Texas State Bobcats football